Yannis Kotsiras (5 October 1969) is a Greek singer and musician.

Biography 

He was born in Athens and started his career in 1990 singing “rebetika” and “laika” at the historical “Perivoli t’ouranou”.
His first personal album “Athoos Enochos” (Innocent Guilty) was released in 1996 with music by Panayiotis Kalantzopoulos and Evanthia Reboutsika and Aris Davarakis’ lyrics.
He has worked with Haris Alexiou, Dimitris Mitropanos, Giorgos Dalaras, Eleftheria Arvanitaki, Vasilis Papakonstantinou, Lavrentis Machairitsas, Nikos Portokaloglou, Eleni Tsaligopoulou, Nikos Antypas, Dimitris Papadimitriou, Dimitris Basis, Kostas Makedonas and others. He wrote songs for Dimitris Mitropanos, Yiannis Koutras, Dimitris Mpasis, Rallia Christidou, Salina and Sofia Strati.
He took part in concerts and Cds of Mikis Theodorakis, Yiannis Markopoulos, Thanos Mikroutsikos and Mimis Plessas.
Since 2010 he started his collaboration with the world famous Yasmin Levi.
In October 2003 he was honoured with the “Best Selling Greek Artist” award within the framework of the World Music Awards held every year in Monaco, a prize covering two years of top sales (2002 and 2003).
In March 2004, just a few days after the Flame-Lighting Ceremony in Ancient Olympia, his CD single “Pass the flame”, containing the song of the Athens 2004 Torch Relay, was released globally. The CD single contained three versions of the song (English lyrics, Greek lyrics, and instrumental). Yiannis Kotsiras performed the song in both languages. “Pass the flame” was written by Trevor Horn, a Grammy awarded composer and producer who has connected his name with great artists internationally (Paul Mc Cartney, Bryan Ferry, Pet Shop Boys, Art of Noise etc.), in collaboration with Lol Creme. The Greek lyrics were written by Lina Nikolakopoulou. The CD was recorded in Sarmwest Studios, the studios Trevor Horn uses in London. The vocals are supported by famous singers from all over the world reflecting the global spirit of the torch relay.
n June 2007 Yiannis gave a great concert at Lycabettus Theater, celebrating his 10 years of live performing, with the participation of many friends. The result was a total success in a sold out night, with more than 7.500 people in the theater.

In 2015 he wrote for a very first time theatrical music for the show “Penelope Delta” that took place for the period of 2014–2015 at the “Daily Theater”. Director: Andromachi Motzoli”.
His latest CD has been released at November 2016 under the title of “Pseftis Kairos” (Lying Times).

Totally he has released 17 personal albums with more than 2 million sales and he has given more than 1.500 concerts in Greece and all over the world.

Discography

Studio albums

 Athoos i enochos (1996)
 Mono ena fili (1997) * IFPI Greece: Double Platinum
 Fylakas Aggelos (1999) * IFPI Greece: Double Platinum
 Ine diki mas i zoi mas (2000) * IFPI Greece: Gold
 Xylino alogaki (2003), composer: Lavrentis Machairitsas * IFPI Greece: Platinum
 30 kai kati (2004) * IFPI Greece: Platinum
 Taxidia filia (2006) * IFPI Greece: Platinum
 Kai pali paidi (2008) * IFPI Greece: Platinum
 I Smyrni tou erota (2012) [& Estudiantina]
 Ilios kokkinos (2012) [Album by Marios Tokas, 3 songs]
 Mousiko kouti (2013) * IFPI Greece: Gold
 O,ti thymasai den pethainei (2014), composer: Thanos Mikroutsikos IFPI Greece: Gold
 Pinelopi Delta (2015) Music for theatre
 Pseftis kairos (2016) IFPI Greece: Gold
 Kita giro (2020)

Live albums 
 Yannis Kotsiras LIVE (2002) IFPI Greece: Double Platinum (More than 1.000.000 copies)
 Ti tragoudi na sou po - DVD (2003) IFPI Greece: Platinum
Yannis Kotsiras Live 2010 (2010) IFPI Greece: Platinum

Compiliations 
 Best of Yiannis Kotsiras (2004)
 Paragelia Best of (2016)

Soundtracks 
 Adis (1996)
 Valkanizater (1997)
 Efapax - cd single (2001)
 Theatrical play "Pinelopi Delta" (2015)

Re-released 
 Axion Esti (2002) (Mikis Theodorakis)
 Pnevmatiko Emvatirio (2002) (Mikis Theodorakis)
 Stavros tou Notou ( 2005) (Thanos Mikroutsikos)
 O Dromos (2006) (Mimis Plessas & Lefteris Papadopoulos)

References

Sources 
 http://kotsiras.gr/en/official-website/
 https://www.discogs.com/artist/1124484-%CE%93%CE%B9%CE%AC%CE%BD%CE%BD%CE%B7%CF%82-%CE%9A%CF%8C%CF%84%CF%83%CE%B9%CF%81%CE%B1%CF%82

1969 births
Greek entehno singers
Greek musicians
Modern Greek-language singers
Living people
Musicians from Athens